The Municipality of Petrovec (Petrovec) is a municipality in northern North Macedonia, near the capital Skopje. Petrovec is also the name of the village where the municipal seat is found. It is located in the Skopje Statistical Region.

Skopje International Airport is located in the Petrovec municipality.

Geography
The municipality borders with Studeničani Municipality and  Zelenikovo Municipality to the west, Ilinden Municipality and Kumanovo Municipality to the north, Sveti Nikole Municipality to the east, and Veles Municipality to the south.

Demographics
According to the 2021 Macedonian census, Petrovec Municipality has 9,150 residents. Ethnic groups in the municipality:

References

 
Skopje Statistical Region
Municipalities of North Macedonia